Richard Holman (born August 23, 1943) is an American politician. He is a member of the North Dakota House of Representatives from the 20th District, serving since 2008. He is a member of the Democratic-NPL party.

References

Living people
1943 births
21st-century American politicians
Democratic Party members of the North Dakota House of Representatives